Margaret Mary Kelly, MBE (born 22 September 1956), later known by her married name Margaret Hohmann, is an English former competitive swimmer who represented Great Britain in the Olympics and FINA world championships, and competed for England in the Commonwealth Games.

Swimming career
Kelly competed in the 1976 and 1980 Summer Olympics, winning a silver medal in 1980 in the women's 4×100-metre medley relay alongside teammates Helen Jameson, Ann Osgerby and June Croft.  At the 1976 Games she had competed in the 100-metre breaststroke, 200-metre breaststroke, and 4×100-metre medley relay, reaching the final in all three events.  In 1980 she swam just the 100-metre breaststroke in addition to the relay medal-winning swim, where she finished fourth in the final in a time of 1:11.48.  She came out of retirement to compete at the 1988 Summer Olympics in Seoul, after giving birth to her first child, Robbie.

She represented England in the backstroke events and the medley relay, at the 1974 British Commonwealth Games in Christchurch, New Zealand. Four years later she represented England again and won a silver medal in the 100 metres breaststroke and two bronze medals in the 200 metres breaststroke and medley relay, at the 1978 Commonwealth Games in Edmonton, Alberta, Canada. As Margaret Hohmann she was selected for the England team again in the breaststroke events, at the 1990 Commonwealth Games in Auckland, New Zealand. She went on to swim at her third Commonwealth Games in 1990 and was a finalist in the women's 100-metre breaststroke at the age of 33.

Kelly won the ASA National Championship title in the 100 metres breaststroke (1976, 1977, 1978 1980) and the title in the 200 metres breaststroke (1977, 1978, 1980). She also won the 1973 100 metres backstroke title.

Coaching
She has coached the University of Nottingham swim team and is now chief coach at Nottingham Leander Swimming Club.

Personal life
She now lives in Nottingham, has three children Robbie, Suki and Georgia, and works for Nottingham Community Housing Association in resident involvement.

See also
 List of Olympic medalists in swimming (women)

References

External links
British Olympic Association athlete profile

1956 births
Living people
Sportspeople from Liverpool
Members of the Order of the British Empire
English female swimmers
Female breaststroke swimmers
Olympic swimmers of Great Britain
Olympic silver medallists for Great Britain
Swimmers at the 1976 Summer Olympics
Swimmers at the 1980 Summer Olympics
Swimmers at the 1988 Summer Olympics
English Olympic medallists
Swimmers at the 1974 British Commonwealth Games
Swimmers at the 1978 Commonwealth Games
Swimmers at the 1990 Commonwealth Games
Commonwealth Games silver medallists for England
Commonwealth Games bronze medallists for England
Medalists at the 1980 Summer Olympics
World Aquatics Championships medalists in swimming
Olympic silver medalists in swimming
Commonwealth Games medallists in swimming
Medallists at the 1978 Commonwealth Games